Count of Ourém (in Portuguese Conde de Ourém) is a Portuguese title granted in 1370 by King Fernando I of Portugal, to Dom João Afonso Telo, uncle of Queen Leonor Teles. Later he also became the fourth Count of Barcelos.

The title subsequently passed to Juan Fernández Andeiro (a Galician noble, lover of the Queen), but when King John I of Portugal seized the throne, his Constable, Nuno Álvares Pereira, inherited it.

When the Constable's daughter married the first Duke of Braganza, Count of Ourém became a subsidiary title of the House of Braganza.

In 1483, Fernando II, third Duke of Bragança, was condemned for treason by order of king John II of Portugal. The House of Braganza estates were confiscated and the Condado of Ourém was granted to Pedro de Menezes, 1st Count of Vila Real, grandson of João Afonso Telo, 1st Count of Ourém.

When king Manuel I inherited the Portuguese throne, he restored the Braganzas with all their previous honours, and from then on the County of Ourém was included in the Braganzas’ assets.

List of the Counts of Ourém
 João Afonso Telo (1310-1381), also 4th Count of Barcelos;
 João Fernandes Andeiro (1320-1383);
 Nuno Álvares Pereira (1360-1431), also 7th Count of Barcelos, 2nd Count of Arraiolos and 2nd Constable of Portugal;
 Afonso of Braganza (1400-1460), also 1st Marquis of Valença;
 Fernando I, Duke of Braganza (1403-1478);
 Fernando II, Duke of Braganza (1430-1483);
 Pedro de Menezes, 1st Count of Vila Real (1425-1499);
 Jaime, Duke of Braganza (1479-1532).

(for the list of holders after this date, see Duke of Braganza)

See also
 Count of Barcelos
 Duke of Braganza
 House of Braganza
 List of Portuguese Dukedoms
 List of Countships in Portugal

Bibliography
”Nobreza de Portugal e do Brasil” – Vol. III, pages 82–84. Published by Zairol Lda., Lisbon 1989.

Countships of Portugal
1370 establishments in Europe
14th-century establishments in Portugal
Ourém